Rosa María Bianchi (born February 18, 1948, in Buenos Aires, Argentina) is an Argentinean-born Mexican actress.

Personal life
Bianchi was married with director of theater Luis de Tavira. They have two sons, José María (b. 1983) & Julián. She is also the aunt of Mexican actress Marina de Tavira.

Filmography

Films

Television

Awards and nominations

Premios Ariel

Premios TVyNovelas

References

External links

1948 births
Living people
Argentine emigrants to Mexico
Naturalized citizens of Mexico
Mexican telenovela actresses
Mexican television actresses
Mexican film actresses
Mexican stage actresses
20th-century Mexican actresses
21st-century Mexican actresses